Acacia latisepala is a species of Acacia native to eastern Australia.

See also
 List of Acacia species

References

latisepala
Fabales of Australia
Flora of New South Wales
Flora of Queensland